Ivan Malenica (born 6 July 1999) is a Croatian water polo player. He is currently playing for VK Solaris. He is 6 ft 4 in (1.92 m) tall and weighs 176 lb (80 kg).

References

living people
1999 births